Ain Leuh is a town in Ifrane Province, Fès-Meknès, Morocco. According to the 2004 census it has a population of 5278.

References

Populated places in Ifrane Province